Goodbye, Janette is a 1981 bestselling novel by Harold Robbins, and his 16th novel.

Though critically panned it sold well.  Over 77,000 copies were sold in the United Kingdom in ten days, and it had an advance printing of 3.75 million copies.  The erotic novel concerns a woman and her daughters who survive a World War II prison camp and move into the world of high fashion, with liberal doses of sadomasochism in the plot.

The novel ranked seventh on the Publishers Weekly bestseller list for 1981.

References

Novels by Harold Robbins
1981 American novels
American novels adapted into films
American erotic novels